Julia Barlow Platt (14 September 1857, in San Francisco – 1935) was an American embryologist, politician and mayor.

Life
Julia Platt received her undergraduate degree from the University of Vermont before moving to Cambridge to perform research at the Harvard Annex in 1887. During her time at Harvard, she challenged the anti-coeducational policies in place. In 1889, she left Harvard to take courses and do research at Woods Hole, Clark University, the University of Chicago, Bryn Mawr, the University of Freiberg, the Naples Zoological Station, and the University of Munich. She obtained her doctorate at Freiburg in 1898. She investigated embryogenesis, in particular the head development, from studying sharks and salamanders. Her most notable contribution to the field was her demonstration that neural crest cells formed the jaw cartilage and tooth dentine in Necturus maculosus (mudpuppy embryos), but her work was not believed by her contemporaries. Her claim went counter to the belief that only mesoderm could form bones and cartilage. Her hypothesis of the neural crest origin of the cranial skeleton gained acceptance only some 50 years later when confirmed by Sven Hörstadius and Sven Sellman.

Unable to obtain a doctoral degree from Radcliffe or secure a university position, she said "if I cannot obtain the work I wish, then I must take up with the next best" and then became active in politics, including tearing down a fence to give the public access to the beach at Lover's Point in Pacific Grove, California.  In 1931, at the age of 74, she became mayor of Pacific Grove, California.  According to Steve Palumbi and Carolyn Sotka, her prescient pioneering setting up of a marine protected area was crucial to the recovery of the sea otter.

Publications
 Platt, J. B. (1890): "The Anterior Head-Cavities of Acanthias (Preliminary Notice)", Zool. Anz. 13: 239
 Platt, J. B. (1892): "Fibres connecting the Central Nervous System and Chorda in Amphioxus", Anat. Anz. 7: 282-284
 Platt, J. B. (1893): "Ectodermic Origin of the Cartilages of the Head", Anat. Anz. 8: 506-509
 Platt, J. B. (1894): "Ontogenetische Differenzirung des Ektoderms in Necturus", Archiv mikr. Anat. 43: 911-966
 Platt, J. B. (1894): "Ontogenetic Differentiations of the Ectoderm in Necturus" Anat. Anz. 9: 51-56
 Platt, J. B. (1898): "The development of the cartilaginous skull and of the branchial and hypoglossal musculature in Necturus", Morphol. Jahrb. 25: 377-464

Notes 

1857 births
1935 deaths
American embryologists
Harvard University alumni
Mayors of places in California
People from Pacific Grove, California
Activists from California
Women mayors of places in California